Mount Quincy Adams, named after John Quincy Adams (1767–1848), the sixth President of the United States, can refer to:

 Mount Quincy Adams, a subsidiary peak of Mount Adams (New Hampshire), New Hampshire, U.S.
 Mount Quincy Adams (Fairweather Range), on the Canada/Alaska, U.S. border

See also
 Mount Adams (disambiguation)